All Fun and Games is an upcoming American horror thriller film written by Ari Costa, Eren Celeboglu and JJ Braider, directed by Costa and Celeboglu and starring Asa Butterfield and Natalia Dyer.  It is Costa and Celeboglu's feature directorial debut.

Cast
Asa Butterfield
Natalia Dyer
Keith David
Annabeth Gish
Benjamin Evan Ainsworth
Laurel Marsden
Kolton Stewart

Production
In January 2022, it was announced that Butterfield and Dyer were cast in the film.

In April 2022, it was announced that principal photography began in Canada and that David, Gish and Ainsworth were added to the cast.  Later that same month, Marsden and Stewart were also added to the cast.

In July 2022, it was announced that Cutting Edge Media Music acquired the rights to the film's original score.

As of November 2022, the film is in post-production.

References

External links
 

Upcoming films
Upcoming directorial debut films
Films shot in Canada